Theodore Bodra (born 1 January 1917, date of death unknown) was an Indian politician. He was a Member of Parliament, representing Bihar in the Rajya Sabha the upper house of India's Parliament as a member of the Jharkhand Party. Bodra is deceased.

References

1917 births
Year of death missing
Jharkhand Party politicians
Rajya Sabha members from Bihar